Dean Fansler, also Dean S. Fansler, was a teacher of English at Columbia University in the early 20th century and brother of Priscilla Hiss (wife of Alger Hiss), who, as a "noted folklorist" helped preserve Filipino folklore culture in the early 20th century, after centuries of Spanish and American domination.

Background

Dean Spruill Fansler was born in 1885.  His father was Thomas Lafayette Fansler, mother Willa Roland Spruill, and younger sister Priscilla Hiss, born Priscilla Harriet Fansler.  In 1906, he received a BA from Northwestern University and MA (1907) and doctorate (1913) from Columbia.

Career

In 1908, Fansler started working at the University of the Philippines.  From then through 1914, he collected Filipino folklore tales.

By 1914, Fansler appears in the Columbia College catalog as an assistant professor of English.  In the early 1920s, Fansler was a professor at Columbia College and receives mention as an acquaintance (probably teacher) in the first autobiography of Mortimer J. Adler.

Franz Boas recommended that Fansler earn his doctorate and inspired him to prepare Philippine material for publication.

Works

In 1956, the "most widely known collection of Philippine folktales" was Dean Fansler's Filipino Popular Tales.

 Chaucer and the 'Roman a la Rose'  (1914)
 Filipino Popular Tales (1921)

See also
 Mortimer J. Adler
 Alger Hiss
 Priscilla Hiss

References

External links
 *
 Filipino Popular Tales
 Filipino Popular Tales
 Filipino Popular Tales

20th-century American educators
1885 births
Columbia University alumni
Columbia University faculty
20th-century American male writers
20th-century American non-fiction writers
American male non-fiction writers
Year of death missing
Academic staff of the University of the Philippines